Pachyplectrinae is a subfamily of thick scavenger scarab beetles in the family Hybosoridae. There is at least one genus, Pachyplectrus, in Pachyplectrinae.

References

Further reading

 
 
 
 
 

scarabaeiformia
Articles created by Qbugbot